Jorge Anegon (born in the Principado de Asturias, Spain on 5 February 1991) is a Spanish actor who has worked in theater and television. At 23, he moved to Madrid to train as an actor, studying in the schools Juan Carlos Corazza and the Theater Laboratory William Layton, where he was taught by Fernando Legs, Concha Doñaque and Marta Fernández Muro. In his last TV appearance, he was part of the cast for the TV series Los nuestros, for Telecinco.

Biography 

Jorge Anegón is an actor born in Spain, in the province of Asturias, on 5 February 1991 (Mieres). From an early age, he communicated to his parents his desire to become an actor, but his parents wanted him to study something with "more future security". After completing his studies in Asturias, Anegón moved to Madrid to study interpretation. The first school he attended was William Layton Laboratory Theatre, followed by Central Theater, Toledo Gate Cultural Center, Teatro Destination or school Juan Carlos Corazza. Jorge studied with Concha Doñate, a reference throughout Spain. Teachers such as Fernando Legs, Marta Fernández Muro, Azucena de la Fuente or Rosa Estévez were also his instructors.

He combines his studies with working as a model for several agencies such as ChicModels and Isabel Navarro, walking in fashion shows for designer Valentino or working in several campaigns for Loewe.

He started his acting career with a role in the television series "Amar en Tiempos Revueltos" in 2007.

Anegón currently collaborates with various foundations, such as the Orange Foundation (belonging to the telecommunications company Orange), which works to help children with autism.

Filmography 

Movies

TV

Voice Actor

VideoClip

Movies (short)

Press 

 Periodico HOY 
 ViviExtremadura 
 Revista HOLA

References 

1983 births
Spanish male actors
Spanish male film actors
Spanish male television actors
Spanish male voice actors
Living people